Wards Cove Packing Co. v. Atonio, 490 U.S. 642 (1989), was a court case concerning employment discrimination, argued before the United States Supreme Court on January 18, 1989, and decided on June 5, 1989.

Facts

A group of nonwhite cannery workers filed suit in District Court citing Title VII of the Civil Rights Act of 1964 complaining that the Wards Cove Packing Company, a company that operated several Alaskan salmon canneries, was using discriminatory hiring practices that resulted in a large number of the skilled permanent jobs that mostly did not involve working in a cannery (referred to as "noncannery" positions) to be filled by white workers, and a large number of the unskilled seasonal cannery jobs to be filled by local nonwhite workers.  In this case the nonwhite workers were predominantly native Alaskans and Filipinos (Alaskeros). The District Court found in favor of the company.

The workers appealed to the United States Court of Appeals for the Ninth Circuit, which reversed the District Court decision, stating the workers had made a prima facie case of disparate impact. The decision was based on statistics provided by the workers that showed a high percentage of nonwhite workers in the cannery jobs and a low percentage of the skilled noncannery jobs filled by nonwhite workers. The court also ruled that if a substantial difference in the racial composition of the available population and the composition of the positions was found, it was up to the claimants to prove that this was due to discriminatory hiring practices.

Judgment
The company then appealed the Court of Appeals' ruling to the United States Supreme Court. The Supreme Court determined that the Court of Appeals had erred by using inappropriate statistics and comparison.  The majority determined that the proper comparison was to compare the percentage of nonwhite workers in noncannery jobs with the percentage of the available labor pool that were nonwhite and who had the appropriate skills to perform the noncannery jobs.

The Supreme Court remanded the case back to the Court of Appeals with instructions to use the more appropriate comparison. Further if, on remand, the Respondents did establish a prima facie disparate-impact case the Petitioners would then need to "produce evidence of a legitimate business justification" for the hiring practices that created the disparity.

Significance
Soon after the decision, Congress amended Title VII with the Civil Rights Act of 1991 to counter the Supreme Court's holding in Ward's Cove, thereby nullifying the case's precedent. The bill, in part, reads:

See also
 List of United States Supreme Court cases, volume 490
 List of United States Supreme Court cases
 Lists of United States Supreme Court cases by volume
 List of United States Supreme Court cases by the Rehnquist Court
 Hazelwood School Dist. v. United States
 Texas Dept. of Community Affairs v. Burdine

Notes

External links

Archives 
 Cannery Workers and Farm Laborers Union Local 7 records. 1915-1985. 46.31 cubic feet.
 Cindy Domingo Papers. 1978-2010. 27.9 cubic feet (28 boxes).
 Silme Domingo Papers. 1952-1992. 1 cubic foot (1 box).
New England Fish Company Records circa 243.81 cubic feet (252 boxes).
  Tyree Scott Papers . circa 1970-1995. 73.00 cubic feet. (73 boxes).

United States Supreme Court cases
United States employment discrimination case law
1989 in United States case law
Asian-American issues
Alaska Natives and United States law
United States Native American case law
United States labor case law
United States Supreme Court cases of the Rehnquist Court
United States racial discrimination case law
United States affirmative action case law